Iran-e-No Party was a short-lived fascist and anticlerical party in Iran of which the motto was "loyalty to the Shah and devotion to progress." The party was cofounded by Abdolhossein Teymourtash in an attempt to form a one-party state. Among the founders were General Morteza Yazdanpanah and the private secretary of Reza Shah, Faraj Allah Bahrami. 

It incorporated most existing parties and became unwieldy as the aspirants to office were eager to join it. Within a few months, it caused a moribund inside the party and a turmoil outside to oppose it, eventually leading to its dissolution. The party mobilized support for Reza Shah, but soon was replaced by its offshoot the Progress Party.

References

External links

Political parties established in 1927
1927 establishments in Iran
Political parties disestablished in 1927
1927 disestablishments in Iran
Monarchist parties in Iran
Fascist parties
Anti-clerical parties
Political parties in Pahlavi Iran (1925–1941)
Fascism in Iran